Bonasse is a town on the Cedros peninsula in Siparia, Trinidad and Tobago.  The origin of its name is French.

Populated places in Trinidad and Tobago